Serga may refer to:
 Serga, Estonia, a village in Setomaa Parish, southeastern Estonia
 Serga (Murmansk Oblast), a river in Murmansk Oblast, Russia
 Serga (Sverdlovsk Oblast), river in Sverdlovsk Oblast, Russia